Dasht Ahu or Dasht-e Ahu may refer to:

Dasht-e Ahu, Kohgiluyeh and Boyer-Ahmad